Angam may refer to:
 Angam (2011 film), a documentary film
 Angam (1983 film), an Indian Malayalam film